St Peter's Church, Letwell, is a parish church of the Church of England in Letwell.

Background

The Church of St Peter is found at the west end of the village of Letwell, near Rotherham, in South Yorkshire. The church was built around 1375 by John Mauleverer, but has been substantially altered several times.  Much of the church was later rebuilt in 1820, at the expense of Henry Gally Knight FRS, the owner of Firbeck Hall, but was largely destroyed by fire a few decades later.

The church today consists of the 14th century tower with a Victorian nave and apse.  It is Grade II* listed.

1867 Fire

The tower, along with the vestry are all that remain of the church following a fire which occurred in 1867.  The fire was inadvertently started by one Harry Radley, who was sexton at the time.  In response to complaints from the parishioners that they were too cold, he had over-stoked the coal-fired boiler which led to the fire.

The church was re-built and decorated in its current form at the expense of Sir Thomas Woollaston White, 2nd Bt., the son of the famous soldier Sir Thomas White, 1st Baronet of Tuxford and Wallingwells, who twice raised the Sherwood Rangers Yeomanry Cavalry at his own expense.  Much of the decoration in the church was contributed by Sir Thomas' daughters.

Organ

The church is unusual as it still uses a harmonium instead of an organ.  The harmonium, dating from the 19th century, was constructed by the Estey Organ Company of Brattleboro, Vermont.

Churchyard

The churchyard is a designated Grade III Botanical site.

Current use

It is part of the Diocese of Sheffield, now under the joint Benefice of St Martin, Firbeck, with St Peter, Letwell and St George, Woodsetts and holds worship every Sunday, alternating Matins and Evensong.

See also
Grade II* listed buildings in South Yorkshire
Listed buildings in Letwell

References

Letwell, St Peter's Church
Grade II* listed churches in South Yorkshire